Serrulina is a genus of air breathing land snails, terrestrial pulmonate gastropod mollusks in the family Clausiliidae, the door snails, all of which have a clausilium.

Species and subspecies
Species and subspecies in the genus Serrulina include:
 Serrulina serrulata (L. Pfeiffer 1847)
 Serrulina serrulata serrulata (L. Pfeiffer 1847)
 Serrulina serrulata amanica (Naegele 1906)
 Serrulina sieversi (L. Pfeiffer 1871)
 Serrulina sieversi sieversi (L. Pfeiffer 1871)
 Serrulina sieversi occidentalis Likharev 1962

References

Clausiliidae